The 2022 NCAA Division I Men's Soccer Tournament was the 64th edition of the NCAA Division I men's soccer tournament, a postseason tournament to determine the national champion of the 2022 NCAA Division I men's soccer season. The tournament started on November 17 and culminate with the Men's College Cup, the semifinals and finals of the tournament, which was played on December 9 and December 12 in Cary, North Carolina. 

In the championship game Syracuse defeated Indiana 2–2 (7–6 pk).

Qualification 

All Division I men's soccer programs are eligible to qualify for the tournament. 20 teams received automatic bids by winning their conference tournaments, 3 teams received automatic bids by claiming the conference regular season crown (the Ivy League, Pac-12 Conference, and West Coast Conference don't hold conference tournaments), and an additional 25 teams earned at-large bids based on their regular season records.

Seeded teams 
The top 16 teams are seeded and earn a bye to the second round of the tournament.

Bracket 
The bracket was announced on Monday, November 14, 2022. First round games will be played on November 17 at campus sites.

Regional 1 

Host Institution*

Regional 2 

Host Institution*

Regional 3 

Host Institution*

Regional 4 

Host Institution*

2022 Men's College Cup

Results

First round

Second round

Third round

Quarterfinals

Men's College Cup Semifinals

Men's College Cup Final

Records by conference 

The R32, S16, E8, F4, CG, and NC columns indicate how many teams from each conference were in the Round of 32 (second round), Round of 16 (third round), Quarterfinals (Elite Eight), Semi-finals (Final Four), Championship Game, and National Champion, respectively.
The following conferences failed to place a team into the round of 32: Big West, Horizon, MAAC, Missouri Valley, Northeast, Patriot, and WAC. The conference's records have been consolidated in the other row.

Statistics

Goalscorers

See also 
 2022 NCAA Division I women's soccer tournament

Notes

References 

Tournament
NCAA Division I Men's Soccer Tournament seasons
NCAA Division I Men's Soccer
NCAA Division I Men's Soccer Tournament
NCAA Division I Men's Soccer Tournament